Heinrich Rischtoff (born February 9, 1865; date of death unknown) was an Austrian foil fencer who competed in the 1900 Summer Olympics.

In the 1900 foil competition, Rischtoff was eliminated in the first round.

References

External links

1865 births
Year of death missing
Austrian male foil fencers
Fencers at the 1900 Summer Olympics
Olympic fencers of Austria
Place of birth missing
Place of death missing